This page details the process of the 1998 African Cup of Nations Qualification phase. Burkina Faso, as hosts, and South Africa, as title holders, qualified automatically.

Banned and withdrawn teams 

 was banned for withdrawing from the 1996 final tournament.

The following countries were banned from entering
for withdrawing during the qualifying stages:

 
 
 
 
 

These teams did not enter:

Qualification rounds

Preliminary round

Qualifying group stage

Group 1 
Sudan withdrew on 16 January 1997, due to unrest in the east of the country. They had already competed one match (0–3 lost to Zimbabwe at home), but this result was later annulled.

Group 2

Group 3

Group 4 
Central African Republic were disqualified on 30 January 1997 after the government refused to allow their squad to travel for a match in Sierra Leone on 25 January. Their results were annulled.
Due to the civil war, Sierra Leone withdrew two matches before the end of the tournament, but their results stood.

Group 5

Group 6 
During the tournament, the country of Zaire was renamed DR Congo.

Group 7

Qualified teams

External links 
 African Nations Cup 1998

Africa Cup of Nations qualification
Qual
Qual
qualification